is a rural district located in central Aichi Prefecture, Japan. As a result of various consolidations and mergers of municipalities, most of the district was incorporated into the cities of Okazaki and Toyota, and now consists of only the town of Kōta.

As of 1 October 2019, the district had an estimated population of 42,200 and a population density of 744 persons per km2. Its total area was 56.72 km2.

History
Nukata is one of the ancient counties of western Mikawa Province. During the Sengoku period, most of the area of the district was controlled by the Matsudaira clan. In the Edo period, under the Tokugawa shogunate, large portions were administered by the feudal domains of Okazaki Domain, Okutono Domain and Nishi-Ohira Domain. After the Meiji Restoration, the area became the short-lived "Nukata Prefecture", which was then merged into Aichi Prefecture.

In the cadastral reforms of the early Meiji period, on October 1, 1889, Nukata District was divided into one town (Okazaki) and 26 villages. Fukuoka village was raised to town status on November 8, 1893, followed by Hirohata village on May 13, 1895. In a round of consolidation in May 1906, the remaining number of villages was reduced from 24 to 15.  Hirohata Town was annexed by Okazaki on October 1, 1914. Okazaki attained city status on July 1, 1916.  The village of Iwazu became a town on September 1, 1928 and later the same year, three neighboring villages were annexed by Okazaki, leaving the district with two towns and 11villages.

Following World War II, on April 1, 1952 the village of Kōta gained town status. On August 1, 1954 the village of Toyosaka from Hazu District merged into the town of Kōta.

The towns of Iwazu and Fukuoka, and the villages of Motojuku, Yamanaka, Fujikawa, Ryudani, and Tokiwa merged into the city of Okazaki on February 1, 1955, and on September 30, 1956 the villages of Toyotomi, Miyazaki, Katano, and parts of Shimoyama merged to form the town of Nukata.

Despite pressure from the central government, on November 14, 2003 Kōta declined to participate the Okazaki-Nukata Region Merger Conference. As a result of this Conference, on January 1, 2006 Nukata merged into the city of Okazaki, leaving Kōta as the only remaining portion of Nukata District.

External links
Counties of Japan

Districts in Aichi Prefecture